Sølvi Vatnhamar (born 5 May 1986 in the Faroe Islands) is a Faroese football player who currently plays for Víkingur Gøta and the Faroe Islands national football team. He is also working as a constructor.

On 13 June 2015 he played his fifth match for the Faroe Islands national football team at the Tórsvøllur stadium against Greece. The Faroe Islands won 2–1 with goals by Hallur Hansson and Brandur Olsen; Vatnhamar assisted both goals.

On 28 March 2016, Vatnhamar scored his first international goal in a 3–2 win against Liechtenstein

International

International goals
Scores and results list Faroe Islands' goal tally first.

Honour 
2016 – Player of the year in the Faroe Islands Premier League.

References 

1986 births
Living people
Faroese footballers
Faroe Islands international footballers
Víkingur Gøta players
Association football midfielders
Faroe Islands under-21 international footballers